Massimiliano Taddei, also known as Max Taddei (born 18 April 1991 in Pontedera) is an Italian professional football who plays for Lega Pro Prima Divisione club Venezia, on co-ownership from Fiorentina.

Biography
On 18 August 2012 he goes on co-ownership to Venezia. On 21 June 2013 Venezia buy the other part property of Fiorentina.

References

1991 births
Living people
Italian footballers
ACF Fiorentina players
A.S. Gubbio 1910 players
Italy youth international footballers
People from Pontedera
Association football midfielders
Sportspeople from the Province of Pisa
Footballers from Tuscany